Petar Barbarić (19 May 1874 – 15 April 1897) was a Roman Catholic novice from Šiljevišta, near Ljubuški, Bosnia Vilayet (modern Bosnia and Herzegovina, who was in the midst of his studies for the priesthood before he died of tuberculosis. He made his solemn profession as a Jesuit prior to his death upon the realization of his condition. Barbarić was known for his devotion to the Sacred Heart of Jesus Christ and for his charismatic nature among his peers.

On 18 March 2015 he was proclaimed to be Venerable after Pope Francis acknowledged the fact that Barbarić had lived a life of heroic virtue.

Life
Petar Barbarić was born in present-day Bosnia and Herzegovina in 1874 in the Croatian family of Ante and Kate Barbarić. He had eight brothers; one was the Franciscan Mate (religious: Marko) Barbarić-Lesko (19 Feb. 1865 – 6 Feb. 1945) who was killed and whose sainthood cause has commenced. He spent his childhood on the farm with the sheep and was known for being an avid reader of religious texts. While in the fields he had his staff in one hand and recited rosaries in the other. His parents also started his initial education with instruction in catechism.

In 1886 the local school in the village opened and he was quick to enter it to commence his studies. He completed his studies in 1888 prior to the required time he was meant to be in school. Had he been in the school for the traditional period he would have concluded his studies in 1890. He ended his time in school with honors. He could not afford for further education so became an apprentice in Vitina where he became a sales assistant and clerk. He remained there until 1889

He commenced his studies for the priesthood in Travnik with the aid of his former teacher Tomislav Vuksan when the latter received a latter asking for recommendations of the best students qualified for further studies or for the priesthood. Both Barbarić and his father travelled to Travnik after their departure on 24 August 1889 and arrived on the following 27 August. He was known for his statement that he would much rather prefer to die than offend Jesus Christ. In 1892 he qualified in the Italian language and went on to complete courses in both French and German. He believed that it would help him in the future for hearing confessions. Barbarić was appointed as the prefect of his class and he encouraged his peers to receive the Eucharist at the end of the first week of each month on the date of the Lord's Passion. In 1896 he made the decision not to just become a diocesan priest but rather a Jesuit.

He demonstrated initial signs of influenza after he returned from an out-of-town trip with his friends on 7 April 1896. It was less than a week after Easter when the group spent their vacation on a picnic and were caught in a storm. However this transcended into tuberculosis unbeknownst to specialists who prescribed him to summer's rest at his home. Barbarić spent a serene summer at home but was unaware of his condition which grew worse when he returned for his studies though didn't know he had contracted tuberculosis until he was re-examined once he returned to resume his studies. He had difficulties walking and had to use a cane to move about a room and was forced to drop his studies in order to recuperate.

On 11 March 1897 he said to his confessor: "I did a novena to Saint Francis Xavier to ask for healing and tomorrow we'll start a novena to Saint Joseph asking for a good death". He received the Anointing of the Sick on the following 10 April. Approval – in the form of a special dispensation – for him to make his solemn profession as a Jesuit came that week which allowed for Barbarić to prepare. He wanted to profess on 15 April but his confessor moved it to 13 April since he believed that Barbarić would not survive to that point. He professed his solemn vows on the evening of 13 April 1897 at 9:00pm.

Barbarić died on 15 April 1897 – on the occasion of the Last Supper – due to tuberculosis. He could not speak much at this point and could not eat. In the first hours of the afternoon he asked for a crucifix in which he kissed it and said: "Jesus". At 2:00pm he made a deep sigh and died. He was buried on 17 April in the Jesuit habit. His remains were relocated in 1935 though removed and hidden in 1944 until being bought out again and later relocated for the last time in 1998 to the church of Saint Alojzije.

Beatification process
The beatification process commenced in Vrhbosna in 1939 – under Pope Pius XII – in an informative process that had been tasked to compile all documentation pertaining to the late seminarian's life and saintliness. The process concluded its business in 1943 during World War II. Theologians maintained in a decree in 1945 that all his writings were in line with the magisterium of the faith. The second process – following the re-ignition of the cause decades later – spanned from 1998 until 2007. These processes were validated in Rome at the behest of the Congregation for the Causes of Saints in 2012.

Historians met to discuss the cause on 20 November 2012 to ascertain if historical obstacles existed and the reason that the cause had not been introduced earlier as a recognition of holiness. Historical questions bought into question were addressed on an adequate level and so the cause was given approval on 20 November 2012.

On 18 March 2015 the title of Venerable was conferred upon him once Pope Francis had signed a decree that recognized the fact that Barbarić had lived a model Christian life of heroic virtue.

The miracle required for his beatification was investigated in the diocese of its origin and received validation from officials in Rome on 13 June 2014.

The current postulator assigned to the cause is the Jesuit priest Anton Witwer.

Bibliography 
Croatian jesuit Josip Weissgerber published his biography ("Zvona velike subote"; The Bells of the Holy Saturday) that was translated to Polish in 1989.

References

External links
Hagiography Circle
Saints SQPN

1874 births
1897 deaths
19th-century deaths from tuberculosis
19th-century venerated Christians
19th-century Bosnia and Herzegovina Roman Catholic priests
19th-century Jesuits
People from Ljubuški
Venerated Catholics by Pope Francis
Tuberculosis deaths in Bosnia and Herzegovina